Muchucux is a community in Chankom Municipality in the state of Yucatán, Mexico.

See also
Chichen Itza
Uayma
Valladolid, Yucatán

References

Populated places in Yucatán